The Show of Shows is a montage documentary film about vaudeville, circuses and carnivals which was assembled from footage from the National Fairground Archive. It has an original soundtrack by members of Sigur Rós and the composer Hilmar Örn Hilmarsson, and was commissioned by BBC Storyville and BBC North .

The film 

The archive which provided the footage is held at the University of Sheffield. For the film, it provided home movies from circus families, moving images of clowns, acrobats, the high wire, human cannonballs and escapologists. Cabaret acts, fairground attractions, variety performances, music hall and seaside entertainments are all part of the fabric of the film. Scenes of animals and children performing for entertainment show how times and attitudes have changed.

The film premiered by opening Sheffield Doc/Fest, and was screened at San Sebastián International Film Festival and Sarajevo Film Festival. It was shown on BBC Four on 17 January 2016 as The Golden Age of Circus: The Show of Shows.

The soundtrack 

The soundtrack was released as Circe – Music Composed For The Show Of Shows on 28 August 2015 by the Krunk label.

References

External links 
 Storyville official page
 

BBC television documentaries
British television documentaries
2015 television films
2015 documentary films
2015 films
Films scored by Hilmar Örn Hilmarsson
Circus television shows
Icelandic documentary films
2010s British films